St Mary Magdalene is a parish church in the Church of England in Campsall in South Yorkshire. It is Grade I listed. There is a service every Sunday at 11:00.

History
The present church, dedicated to St Mary Magdalene, was established towards the end of the eleventh century and contains features of almost every style of architecture since that time. Originally the Norman church was planned to be cruciform but it was changed to feature the western tower and included a chancel, transepts and a nave to which aisles were later added. The church was supported for many years by its principal benefactors, the Yarbrough family of Campsmount. Several of the monuments in the chancel are dedicated to the Yarbrough family including an 1803 memorial commemorating Thomas Yarbrough by renowned sculptor, John Flaxman. In 1879, when the Rev. Edwin Castle was vicar, eight bells (three new and five re-cast) were installed along with a new clock. The vicarage had been restored the previous year.

Robin Hood
It is locally reputed that legendary outlaw Robin Hood was married to Maid Marian at this church. Based upon a Child Ballad, the theory is founded on the premise that St Mary Magdalene is the only possible church in the area to fit the description, but no firm evidence exists for this supposition. In 2013, when the National Churches Trust were compiling a list of the nation's favourite places of worship, the local MP Ed Miliband nominated St Mary Magdalene because of its association with the Robin Hood legend.

See also
Grade I listed buildings in South Yorkshire
Listed buildings in Norton and Askern

References

External links

Campsall St Mary Magdalene A Church Near You

Church of England church buildings in South Yorkshire
Grade I listed churches in South Yorkshire
11th-century church buildings in England
Mary Magdalene